KFC Pakistan ( or ) is the Pakistani franchise of KFC which operates 116 locations across Pakistan with 5,800 employees.  Its first restaurant was established in Karachi in 1997.

History and overview
KFC Pakistan had its first franchises in the late '60s to early '70s. It then reopened in Gulshan-e-Iqbal in Karachi in 1997. KFC now contributes PKR 10 million in taxes to the Government of Pakistan.

Food Items 
KFC Pakistan's menu consists of burgers, sandwiches, fried chicken, nuggets, hot wings, French fries, rice dishes, twister wraps and drinks. KFC in Pakistan introduced a new food item named "Zingeratha" which is a fusion of the Zinger and paratha, a traditional bread in Pakistan. In January 2020, KFC Pakistan introduced Thai sweet chili wings and Buffalo wings.

Incidents
The American Origin KFC branches became a target for anti-American protests, resulting in the burning of the Gulshan-e-Iqbal branch, which resulted in the death of 6 people. This prompted the franchise to rebrand itself as a Pakistani-run business.

Gallery

References

Fast-food chains of Pakistan
Yum! Brands
KFC by country

See also
McDonald's Pakistan
List of the largest fast food restaurant chains
Pakistani Cuisine